Dracaena pearsonii is a species of succulent plant native to Southern Africa. This species is in a complex of plants including Dracaena stuckyi and Dracaena angolensis that are characterized by their cylindrical leaves that grow upright in a spear-like habit. It grows in desert or dry shrubland, has thick rhizomes that produce offsets.

References 

pearsonii
Flora of Tanzania
Flora of South Tropical Africa
Flora of Southern Africa
Plants described in 1915